Trashed is the second album by the punk rock group Lagwagon, released on January 4, 1994.

Production and composition

Like its predecessor, Duh, Trashed was recorded at Westbeach Recorders in 1993 with producer Fat Mike. The album was also produced by the band themselves.

Discussing "Know It All", guitarist Shawn Dewey explained that it was "constructive criticism, towards people who are involved in the whole scene and they like certain bands at certain times."

Reception

Trashed was released on January 4, 1994 through Fat Wreck Chords.

Trashed was also released in the same year as Green Day's Dookie, Bad Religion’s Stranger than Fiction, NOFX's Punk in Drublic, and The Offspring's Smash, which are all widely considered to be the most important and successful albums of the 1990s California punk scene era. New York melodic hardcore punk band After the Fall has a song called "1994", which mentions Trashed and other albums released that year. 1994 is from their 2009 album Fort Orange. Trashed includes a cover of Van Morrison's "Brown Eyed Girl" on track 10.

Artwork
The album's cover features scattered garbage, which references the album's title. In the center of the trash is a photograph of the Lagwagon members. The 1979 AC/DC album Highway to Hell is seen at the top right of the cover. The back cover features a picture of the back of the band's tour van, spray painted with the track names.

Track listing
 "Island of Shame" – 2:39
 "Lazy" – 1:48
 "Know It All" – 2:29
 "Stokin' the Neighbors" – 3:08
 "Give It Back" – 2:35
 "Rust" – 2:58
 "Goin' South" – 2:00
 "Dis'chords" – 3:15
 "Coffee and Cigarettes" – 2:51
 "Brown Eyed Girl" (Van Morrison cover)– 3:22
 "Whipping Boy" – 2:22
 "No One" – 2:01
 "Bye for Now" – 3:47
 "Back One Out" (Hidden Track, parody cover of Mama Said Knock You Out by LL Cool J) – 1:31

Personnel

References

External links

Trashed at YouTube (streamed copy where licensed)

Lagwagon albums
1994 albums
Fat Wreck Chords albums